The Roman Catholic Archdiocese of Tamale is the Metropolitan See for the Ecclesiastical province of Tamale in Ghana.

History

 1926.01.11: Established as Apostolic Prefecture of Navrongo from the Apostolic Vicariate of Ouagadougou in Burkina Faso
 1934.02.26: Promoted as Apostolic Vicariate of Navrongo
 1950.04.18: Established as Diocese of Tamale from the Apostolic Vicariate of Navrongo; Navrongo would be revived as a diocese name in 1956 for a new diocese which later became the Roman Catholic Diocese of Navrongo–Bolgatanga
 1977.05.30: Promoted as Metropolitan Archdiocese of Tamale

Special churches
The seat of the archbishop is Our Lady of Annunciation Cathedral in Tamale.

Bishops

Ordinaries
Prefect Apostolic of Navrongo 
Father Oscar Morin, M. Afr. (1926.04.14 - 1934.02.26)
Vicars Apostolic of Navrongo 
 Bishop Oscar Morin, M. Afr. (1934.02.26 – 1947.04.15)
 Bishop Gérard Bertrand, M. Afr. (1948.06.10 – 1950.04.18)
 Bishops of Tamale 
 Bishop Gerard Bertrand, M. Afr. (1950.04.18 – 1957.04.12), appointed Bishop of Navrongo; see above
 Bishop Gabriel Champagne, M. Afr. (1957.04.12 – 1972.06.23)
 Bishop Peter Porekuu Dery (1974.11.18 – 1977.05.30); future cardinal
 Metropolitan Archbishops of Tamale (Roman rite)
 Archbishop Peter Porekuu Dery (1977.05.30 – 1994.03.26); elevated to cardinal in 2006
 Archbishop Gregory Ebolawola Kpiebaya (1994.03.26 - 2014.02.12)
 Archbishop Philip Naameh since 2014.02.12

Other priests of this diocese who became bishop
Peter Paul Yelezuome Angkyier (priest here, 1992–1995), appointed Bishop of Damongo in 2010

Suffragan Dioceses
 Damongo
 Navrongo–Bolgatanga
 Wa
 Yendi

See also
 Roman Catholicism in Ghana

Sources
 GCatholic.org

Tamale
Tamale